Anthidium albitarse is a species of bee in the family Megachilidae, the leaf-cutter, carder, or mason bees.

Distribution
This species is found the tip of North America, in Central America near Panama.

References

albitarse
Insects described in 1917